Charles Frederic August Schaeffer (12 June 1860 – 29 August 1934) was an American entomologist who specialized in beetles, particularly chrysomelids and weevils. He described 109 species in 91 genera and some species like Taphrocerus schaefferi Nicolay & Weiss were described from his collections and named after him.

Schaeffer was born in London to German parents. When the family returned to Germany, he was educated there and became interested in insects at a very young age. It is not known when he moved to the United States but he was one of the founding members of the Brooklyn Entomological Society in 1892. He was an active member of the group and in 1898, he became an assistant to William Beutenmuller of the American Museum of Natural History, becoming a curator in 1902 at the Brooklyn Museum Institute of Arts and Sciences. He made numerous collecting trips mainly in Mount Mitchell, North Carolina; Lower Rio Grande Valley, Texas (Esperanza Ranch east of Brownsville); and the Huachuca Mountains of Arizona. He described numerous species in his publications.

Schaefers's publications include:

References

External links 
 Beetles described by Schaeffer

American entomologists
20th-century American biologists
1860 births
Date of death missing
1934 deaths